Britain's Ancient Tracks with Tony Robinson is a television documentary series presented by Sir Tony Robinson. The first series, consisting of three episodes, was broadcast in 2016 by Channel 4.

A second series of four episodes began airing on Channel 4 on 23 September 2017.

Premise
The series follows Tony Robinson as he walks along Britain's ancient tracks, exploring the history and changes along the way.

Episode List – Series 1

Episode List – Series 2

References

External links
 

2016 British television series debuts
2017 British television series endings
2010s British documentary television series
Channel 4 documentary series
English-language television shows